The Judy Bolton Mystery Series, written by Margaret Sutton, follows a realistic young woman who solves mysteries. Although the series was not quite as popular as Nancy Drew, Judy Bolton has been called a more complex and believable role model for girls. Judy was also unique in that halfway through the series, she married (something series book heroines rarely, if ever, did) The 38-volume series was written from 1932 and 1967 and is the longest-lasting juvenile mystery series written by an individual author.

In September 2012, the 39th volume, The Strange Likeness, was published by Applewood books, which has re-printed titles in the series since 1991. In 1968, Sutton had created the title and the beginnings of a plot outline of a mystery located in Panama; however co-authors Kate Duvall and Beverly Hatfield never saw the original outline and wrote the book instead from their original ideas, with the Sutton family's permission.

Characters

The mainstays of the series were Judy Bolton, auburn-haired girl detective; her brother, news reporter Horace Bolton; her parents, Dr. and Mrs. Bolton; and her loyal black cat, Blackberry.  For most of the early volumes she was torn between suitors: the wealthy Arthur Farringdon-Pett, and the upstanding lawyer Peter Dobbs, before finally choosing Peter in volume 10. Her best friend was Peter's sister, Grace Dobbs, also known as Honey; her rival for Arthur's affections was Lorraine Lee. Judy was friends with Arthur's sister, Lois Farringdon-Pett, and one of her high-school archenemies was snobbish Kay Vincent.  Judy also befriended a mill worker, Irene Lang, who later became Irene Meredith.

Critical assessment
Judy Bolton has been called a better feminist role model than Nancy Drew because "Nancy Drew is more likely to uphold the ideological status quo, while Judy Bolton is more likely to restore moral rather than legal order, because her mysteries tend to emphasize human relationships over material possessions." Unlike Drew, Bolton often enlists the aid of family members and friends in solving mysteries; she "works in a collaborative way that subverts dominant values."

Judy is emotional and self-doubting; for this reason she has been called a "more believable" female role model. As a part of her collaborative approach, Judy is often defined in relation to men: as Dr. Bolton's daughter or later, as Peter Dobbs' wife.

Publication history

There were 38 titles in the original Judy Bolton series, all copyrighted between 1932 and 1967. The final 12, particularly the last one, had limited printings and as a result are hard to find. Collectors often find themselves paying upwards of $200 for a volume in good condition. The series ended before the 39th book, The Strange Likeness, could be published. According to author Margaret Sutton, the series was killed due not to poor sales, but to pressure from the Stratemeyer Syndicate. The Stratemeyer Syndicate wished to lessen competition for the Nancy Drew series. Pelagie Doane illustrated many of the early Judy Bolton books.

During, and after, the course of the series, a number of translations were published internationally. Among these were Icelandic, Norwegian, Swedish, Danish and Spanish editions.

In 1997, three decades after Grosset & Dunlap issued the last Judy Bolton title, author Linda Joy Singleton completed a book that series creator Margaret Sutton had begun writing several years before. Once the first draft was finished, Singleton submitted it to Sutton for revisions, and the book that emerged from their collaboration carries the name of both co-authors.  Chronologically, The Talking Snowman takes place during the Christmas season between the events described in volume 3 and volume 4, and thus is known to collectors as "volume 3.5".

Another title, The Whispering Belltower, was written by Kate Emburg with the encouragement of Margaret Sutton.

In 2012, with the permission of Margaret Sutton's family, co-authors Kate Duvall and Beverly Hatfield wrote The Strange Likeness based on Sutton's original title. The book, #39 in the Judy Bolton Mystery Series, was edited by Sutton's youngest daughter, Lindsay Sutton Stroh, and illustrated by another daughter, Marjorie Sutton Eckstein. It was followed in 2018 by The Mystery on Judy Lane, the 40th book in the series, also written by Hatfield.

Titles

1. The Vanishing Shadow (1932)
2. The Haunted Attic (1932)
3. The Invisible Chimes (1932)
3.5. The Talking Snowman (1980)
4. Seven Strange Clues (1932)
5. The Ghost Parade (1933)
6. The Yellow Phantom (1933)
7. The Mystic Ball (1934)
8. The Voice in the Suitcase (1935)
9. The Mysterious Half Cat (1936)
10. The Riddle of the Double Ring (1937)
11. The Unfinished House (1938)
12. The Midnight Visitor (1939)
13. The Name on the Bracelet (1940)
13.5 The Mystery on Judy Lane (2018)
14. The Clue in the Patchwork Quilt (1941)
15. The Mark on the Mirror (1942)
16. The Secret of the Barred Window (1943)
17. The Rainbow Riddle (1946)
18. The Living Portrait (1947)
19. The Secret of the Musical Tree (1948)
20. The Warning on the Window (1949)

21. The Clue of the Stone Lantern (1950)
22. The Spirit of Fog Island (1951)
23. The Black Cat's Clue (1952)
24. The Forbidden Chest (1953)
25. The Haunted Road (1954)
26. The Clue in the Ruined Castle (1955)
27. The Trail of the Green Doll (1956)
28. The Haunted Fountain (1957)
29. The Clue of the Broken Wing (1958)
30. The Phantom Friend (1959)
31. The Discovery at the Dragon's Mouth (1960)
32. The Whispered Watchword (1961)
33. The Secret Quest (1962)
34. The Puzzle in the Pond (1963)
35. The Hidden Clue (1964)
36. The Pledge of the Twin Knights (1965)
37. The Search for the Glowing Hand (1966)
38. The Secret at the Sand Castle (1967)
39. The Strange Likeness (2012)

Notes

References

 Carpan, Carolyn. Sisters, Schoolgirls, and Sleuths: Girls' Series Books in America. New York: Rowman and Littlefield, 2009.
 Ghent, Janet. "The Mysterious Demise of Judy Bolton." (Oakland, CA) Tribune. 25 May 1987. Page C1. Accessed through Access World News on 10 April 2009.
 Macleod, Anne Scott. American Childhood: Essays on Children's Literature of the Nineteenth and Twentieth Centuries. Athens, GA: University of Georgia Press, 1995. .
 Mason, Bobbie Ann. The Girl Sleuth. Revised edition. Athens, GA: University of Georgia Press, 1995. .
 Moske, Jim. Stratemeyer Syndicate records, 1832-1984. The New York Public Library, 2000. Accessed 6 April 2009.
 Nash, Ilana. American Sweethearts: Teenage girls in twentieth-century popular culture. Indiana University Press, 2006. .
 Parry, Sally. "The Secret of the Feminist Heroine: The Search for Values in Nancy Drew and Judy Bolton." In Nancy Drew and Company: Culture, Gender, and Girls’ Series. Edited by Sherrie A. Inness. Popular Press 1, 1997. .

External links
JudyBolton.com

Book series introduced in 1932
American mystery novels
American young adult novels
Children's mystery novels
Bolton, Judy
Grosset & Dunlap books
Juvenile series
Young adult novel series